Chlopsis longidens is an eel in the family Chlopsidae. It was described by Samuel Garman in 1899, originally under the genus Atopichthys. It is known from a single leptocephalus specimen collected from between Ecuador and the Galapagos Islands, in the central eastern Pacific Ocean. From that specimen. the species is known to dwell in a tropical, marine climate at a maximum depth of 3,184 m. The specimen may possibly be a larval bicolor false moray (Chlopsis bicollaris).

References

Chlopsidae
Fish described in 1899